Argyrostrotis deleta is a moth of the family Noctuidae first described by Achille Guenée in 1852. It is found in the United States from Virginia south to Florida and Texas.

The wingspan is 20–24 mm.

References

Moths described in 1852
Catocalinae
Moths of North America